Marcellino Lucchi (born 13 March 1957 in Cesena) is an Italian former Grand Prix motorcycle road racer. His best year was in 1998 when he won the Italian Grand Prix and finished 15th in the 250cc world championship.

Career statistics

Grand Prix motorcycle racing

Races by year
(key) (Races in bold indicate pole position) (Races in italics indicate fastest lap)

References 

1957 births
Living people
People from Cesena
Italian motorcycle racers
250cc World Championship riders
500cc World Championship riders
Sportspeople from the Province of Forlì-Cesena